Rhythm of Love is the third studio album to be recorded by Australian singer Kylie Minogue. It was released in the United Kingdom on 12 November 1990 by Pete Waterman Limited (PWL) and in Australia on 3 December 1990 by Mushroom Records. Minogue started to become more involved in the writing and production of the album. Recording sessions took place in London and Los Angeles during early-to-mid 1990. Minogue was credited as co-writer for the first time while Stock Aitken Waterman (SAW) were the primary producers along with new producers and collaborations, including Keith Cohen, Stephen Bray and Michael Jay.

Rhythm of Love is a musical departure from Minogue's earlier bubblegum pop records, and has a more sexually liberated image and dance-influenced sound. It received generally positive reviews from music critics, being complimented as her best work with SAW. The album was not as commercially successful as Minogue's previous albums, becoming her first studio album not to reach number one in the UK, reaching number nine on the UK Albums Chart. In Australia, it was Minogue's third top 10 studio album, peaking at number 10, while also attaining top 20 positions in Ireland, France, and Spain.

Four accompanying singles were released—"Better the Devil You Know", "Step Back in Time", "What Do I Have to Do", and "Shocked"—all of which peaked inside the top 10 in the UK and Ireland, making Minogue the first artist to have their first 13 releases reach the top 10 in the former region. Promotion for Rhythm of Love included controversial music videos and continued to associate Minogue with an increasingly provocative image. Minogue further promoted the album with her Rhythm of Love Tour, traveling to Australia and Asia. The album was re-issued in the UK in 2015, when it returned to the UK Albums Chart.

Background
Kylie Minogue relocated to London after filming her final scenes for Neighbours between June and July 1988. She tried to steer her public image away from her character of Charlene Robinson, a schoolgirl-turned-garage mechanic whom Minogue felt was an exploitation of her career. In April 1989, it was announced Minogue had accepted the lead role of Lola Lovell for that year's film The Delinquents. She believed the role of a rebellious, passionate country girl that suffers through an abortion during her teenage years and has several love scenes in the film would establish her as a serious actor. Principal photography of The Delinquents began in May 1989 and lasted about two months, coinciding with the recording of Minogue's second album Enjoy Yourself (1989). Released in late 1989, both the film and the album were commercially successful though received mixed reviews from critics, many of whom considered them as failed attempts to differentiate Minogue's girl-next-door image.

Minogue first met Michael Hutchence, lead singer of Australian rock band INXS, at the Countdown Awards ceremony in July 1987. They started a romantic affair in Hong Kong during September 1989, a few days before Minogue's  first concert tour, Disco in Dream, kicked off. That December, Minogue broke up with her partner of three years and Neighbours co-star, Jason Donovan, over the telephone, and later attended the Australian premiere of The Delinquents with Hutchence; the couple's public announcement of their relationship attracted intense attention. Minogue also sang on "Do They Know It's Christmas?", an all-star ensemble charity single that was released to raise funds for famine relief in Ethiopia. Produced by Stock Aitken Waterman (SAW), the song was the Christmas number-one single on the UK Singles Chart and the ninth biggest-selling single of 1989 in the United Kingdom.

Recording and production

As alternative rock and techno entered the musical mainstream, the SAW struggled to find their audience. They became more aware of their gay following, who still embraced the trio's pop output. According to Mike Stock, their "pure pop songs about love, life, and feelings" had strong appeal for women and some men, including gay men. The trio also acknowledged Minogue's evolving public image and discussed how to change the musical and lyrical emphasis for her next album. They decided to subtly move on from Minogue's previous material to avoid alienating her fans.

Rhythm of Love was recorded in early-to-mid 1990. Minogue started recording for the album in March, after finishing the Australian leg of the Enjoy Yourself Tour. The first three songs recorded at the PWL Studios, London were "Better the Devil You Know", "What Do I Have To Do", and "Things Can Only Get Better"; the former song was recorded within three hours. Once the tour ended in May, she finished four other tracks with SAW in late July: "Step Back in Time", "Secrets", "Always Find the Time", and "Shocked". For the album, SAW tried to adopt a more appropriate approach for the current music market. Matt Aitken stated they took many cues from techno music and felt "pure pop [songs] had run its course" at the time. Due to Pete Waterman's background as a disc jockey in gay clubs, Pete Waterman Limited (PWL) co-owner David Howells thought making more club-oriented songs for Minogue was unavoidable. Meanwhile, Stock was not familiar with club music and felt isolated in many respects. SAW also had to update their rhythm tracks to match the popular Roland TR-909 sound. "We struggled to make it sound more like what everybody else was doing at the time, but we got there in the end", said Aitken of creating the sound. 

Hutchence was with Minogue during the sessions; he listened to the rough tapes and gave her advice about songwriting. "[Hutchence] really does help me and influence me a lot ... He encourages me to be myself and go for it", Minogue said of his input. During the production of Rhythm of Love, Minogue began to take more control over her workload. She came up with many visual ideas, and took inspiration from American singer Madonna and her fourth studio album Like a Prayer (1989). Before starting to work on Rhythm of Love, Minogue asked to record some of the tracks with producers other than SAW, which they accepted. According to Waterman, Minogue "was going to clubs, seeing different people, hearing different things ... I knew the artist was going to want to get involved". 

In March 1990, she went to Los Angeles to enlist the help of other producers. Sessions with Keith Cohen, Michael Jay, and Madonna's longtime collaborator Stephen Bray produced the tracks "The World Still Turns", "One Boy Girl", "Count the Days", and "Rhythm of Love"—all of which credited Minogue as co-writer for the first time. Minogue wanted to work with Jay upon hearing his work with American singer Martika; they collaborated on "The World Still Turns", Minogue's first co-written song from the LA sessions. She wrote "One Boy Girl" with Willie Wilcox in August, who came up with the title. The original demo for the track featured a male rapper; Cohen later replaced him with verses by American female rapper The Poetess. Bray co-wrote "Rhythm of Love" and "Count the Days" with Minogue; while recording "Rhythm of Love", he had an idea for the chorus of "Count the Days", to which Minogue subsequently contributed her verses. She managed to finish the album by September. Minogue was proud of the songs she had written and felt Rhythm of Love was a more important project to her than her two previous albums. In Los Angeles, the sessions took place at Trax Recording, Ultimo, Ground Control Studio, Scotland Yard, Larrabee Sound, and Saturn Sound.

Music and lyrics
Rhythm of Love is primarily a dance-pop album, marking a departure from the bubblegum pop music of Minogue's earlier work. It has a more dance-oriented production and instrumentation, which includes saxophone and guitar. Select Andrew Harrison said most of the album "goose-steps to Stock Aitken Waterman's mercilessly mutated house beat". Marc Andrews from Smash Hits stated Rhythm of Love "is not as 'different' as it could have been", with the majority of the tracks being "familiar boompy-tee-boomp backbeat, swirling strings and relentless thumping drums". He also said the album is "pretty much a cracking pop outing" overall. Cameron Adams from the Herald Sun considered it the first album "that tried to inject some R&B" into Minogue's output. John Lyons of The Sydney Morning Herald wrote that the album features more "American sounds" like funk and rap.

The opening track, "Better the Devil You Know", is a dance-pop song with worldbeat influences, in which Minogue struggles with a lover's flaws. SAW wrote the song as a response to Minogue's departure from Neighbours and her over-publicised romantic relationships with Donovan and Hutchence. Joe Sweeney of PopMatters compared Minogue's delivery with that of Madonna. A disco song about the love of music, "Step Back in Time" is one of a few non-relationship-themed tracks by Minogue; it pays homage to 1970s disco music by referencing titles and catchphrases, and includes uncredited samples of Bobby Byrd's song "Hot Pants – I'm Coming, Coming, I'm Coming" (1972) and B. T. Express's song "Give Up the Funk (Let's Dance)" (1980). Adams described the track as "Motown meets Hi-NRG meets Studio 54" and said it may have laid the path for her disco-related material. The rave-infused track "What Do I Have To Do" features piano lines, whooshing noises, and built-in rushes. The song was compared with Madonna's "Vogue" (1990), Black Box's "Ride on Time" (1989), and Deee-Lite's "Groove is in the Heart" (1990). In the lyrics, Minogue tries to get a man to know how much she loves him with a more mature approach; the song includes lyrics such as "There ain't a single night / When I haven't held you tight / But it's always inside my head / Never inside my bed."

"Secrets" is similar to the earlier work of Olivia Newton-John and Minogue's previous studio album Enjoy Yourself (1989). It shows the singer's vulnerability towards her lover, with Minogue being scared that her secrets will force him to leave. She sings about falling in love on "Always Find The Time", a SAW-produced upbeat track with incidental cymbal crashes, and samples from Mary Jane Girls' 1983 single "Candy Man", written and composed by Rick James. Jeremy Mark of Number One noted that "The World Still Turns", the first song on Rhythm of Love co-written by Minogue, is "the only real attempt at a ballad on the album", although its pace is "not especially slow and smoochy". The song talks about moving on from a failed relationship. On the seventh track "Shocked", Minogue sings about being surprised to find herself deeply in love. It has a sophisticated dance sound with electric guitars and a disco beat. "One Boy Girl" blends rhythmic new jack swing with house elements, and includes strong dance beats and a rap conversation between Minogue and The Poetess, who is uncredited. 

"Things Can Only Get Better" is a dance song influenced by the soundtrack to 1977 film Saturday Night Fever that has a message about striving to fulfil one's dreams. Harrison compared the song to New Order's "Vanishing Point" from their fifth studio album Technique (1989). An ode to long-distance relationships, Minogue co-wrote "Count the Days" with Bray and dedicated it to her relationship with Hutchence, saying: "It's obviously difficult for us to match up – we're both so busy". Ian Wade from Classic Pop said the "jaunty" pop song was strongly influenced by Madonna and that it "wouldn't have been out of place on True Blue". Mark found the merry tune of "Count the Days" is reminiscent of Madonna's "Everybody" (1983) and the early work of Paula Abdul. He called "Rhythm of Love", the title and closing track, "an exceedingly Madonna-esque affair" while Wade noted its similarities to Janet Jackson's "Rhythm Nation" (1989).

Artwork and release

The album's artwork was photographed by Austrian photographer Markus Morianz; it shows Minogue wearing a white, bare-midriff blouse and raising her hands behind her head. Christian Guiltenane of Classic Pop said the seductive pose offers "a freer—and, it was implied— more sexually liberated" nature than her earlier image. Writing for Idolator, Robbie Daw commented that the cover "[takes] a drastic turn for the sexy." English artist Nick Egan, who previously art-directed sleeves for Duran Duran and INXS, handled the design for Rhythm of Love with designer Eric Roinestad. The photograph session for Rhythm of Love took place within Los Angeles in October 1990; Minogue wore a small, cropped leotard with chains and a white, feather costume while standing in a desert. Minogue donated the bikini costume with boots worn in the photoshoot, which was designed by Azzedine Alaïa, to the Cultural Gifts Program of the Arts Centre Melbourne in 2004. A month before the album's UK release, photographs from the session were featured in a six-page spread for Smash Hits, in which Minogue said of her "dramatic" new image, "I've grown up. I'm more womanly!... I think the outrageous me has been kinda subdued for a long time and now it's coming out!"

Rhythm of Love was released in the UK on 12 November by PWL and in Australia on 3 December 1990 by Mushroom Records. Two special editions of Rhythm of Love were released in 1990 and 1991, with an Australasian Tour souvenir edition was released in Australia to support the tour; it included three bonus tracks in a gold outer sleeve—the edition was later released in the UK and is commonly referred to as the Gold edition. Another edition in special packaging was exclusively released in Australia in 1990 to promote the single "Shocked". In Japan, the album was first released on 15 December 1990 by PWL. It was re-released twice by WEA in 1993 and 1995, while PWL reissued it in 2012 with bonus tracks and mixes. Kylie's Remixes: Vol. 2, an eleven-track compilation of remixed songs from Rhythm of Love and Let's Get to It (1991), Minogue's fourth studio album, was released across Japan in July 1992. The compilation album peaked at number 90 on the Oricon Albums Chart and has sold 7,330 copies, as of 2006. Kylie's Remixes: Vol. 2 was released in Australia in 1993.

In October 2014, it was announced Rhythm of Love, along with Enjoy Yourself, Let's Get to It, and Minogue's debut studio album Kylie (1988), was to be re-released by Cherry Red Records and PWL. The original release date of 27 October 2014 was later postponed to 9 February 2015. The albums were digitally remastered from the original studio tapes and were made available on vinyl, CD, and DVD. This was the first time they had been re-released in the UK. "I Am the One for You", which was written by Minogue, Phil Harding and Ian Curnow, was an unused track from recording sessions before ultimately being released on Minogue's Australia-only compilation album Greatest Remix Hits 4 (1998).

Promotion

Minogue failed to find an audience in the United States following the release of Enjoy Yourself, and Geffen Records dropped her as an artist. Subsequently, MCA Records refused to distribute Rhythm of Love and cancelled plans to release "Better The Devil You Know" on the soundtrack of a new US film. The single "Shocked" and its music video were deemed unsuitable for the market. In Australia and Asia, Minogue promoted the album with her Rhythm of Love Tour, which was sponsored by Coca-Cola, from February to March 1991. Her provocative dance moves and choice of costumes—PVC mini-dresses and skin-tight body suits—drew strong reactions from critics, many of whom compared them to costumes worn by Madonna. Minogue said, "Madonna has definitely influenced me as have lots of people, men and women ... I am certainly not trying to imitate Madonna. I'm continuing to develop my own style." Four costume pieces worn for the tour were also sent to the Arts Centre Melbourne in 2004 by Minogue.

Singles

The album spawned four singles, which are sometimes referred to as "The Golden Quartet". The lead single "Better the Devil You Know" was released on 30 April 1990. An accompanying music video was directed by Paul Goldman and was filmed in Melbourne—away from the constraints of PWL—over two days in early April of that year. The video's sexual tone caused controversy—it featured Minogue dancing in a revealing black dress and posing suggestive scenes with a shirtless black man. In the UK, "Better the Devil You Know" became her fifth non-consecutive number two single on the UK Singles Chart, and stayed at the position for two consecutive weeks. It further peaked within the top five in Australia, Belgium, and Ireland.

"Step Back in Time" was released on 22 October 1990 as the album's second single. It debuted at number eight on the Australian Singles Chart, before peaking at number five the following week. The song experienced similar performance on the UK Singles Chart, where it debuted at number nine and peaked at number four the following week. "Step Back in Time" became Minogue's second consecutive single to peak at number four on the Irish Singles Chart. The song's music video was directed by Egan in Los Angeles a month before the single's release; this marked her first video to be filmed in the US. Minogue paid homage to 1960s and 1970s culture in the video, which opens with Minogue putting an 8-track tape into a stereo, and continues with clips of her and back-up dancers dancing near a large cityscape while wearing colourful clothing. Minogue and the dancers are also drive through Los Angeles in a red Cadillac car.

Originally planned to be the follow-up single to "Better the Devil You Know", a remix of "What Do I Have to Do" was released on 21 January 1991 as the third single from Rhythm of Love. An accompanying music video that is set mostly in black-and-white was directed by Dave Hogan in London during December 1990. In the video, Minogue appears in a variety of film star looks, irons clothes while wearing a French maid costume, and shows a tattoo of a black panther on her back. Kylie's sister Dannii Minogue appears in the video as a cameo to silence tabloid rumors about a feud between the two of them. Model Zane O'Connell, who later became Kylie's boyfriend, also had a cameo role in the music video. The video's sexual undertones were too much for Saturday morning television shows in the UK, with the programmes airing a censored version of it. The single was Minogue's first to miss the top 10 in Australia, where it peaked at number 11; the song also broke her run of top-five singles in the UK, where it peaked at number six. The song also peaked at number six in Ireland, becoming Minogue's third top 10 single from Rhythm of Love in the region.

English producers DNA asked to remix "Shocked", which was released as the fourth and final single from the album on 20 May 1991. The remix includes a rap during the bridge that was written and performed by Jazzi P. The song's music video, which was also directed by Hogan, was filmed at the Pinewood Studios, Iver Health, on 24 and 25 April 1991. In the video, Minogue kisses a man in the back of a car, which arrived at a mansion. Jazzi P raps through a keyhole and O'Connell again appears as Minogue's lover. "Shocked" peaked at number six on the UK Singles Chart, making Minogue the first artist to have their first 13 releases chart inside the top 10. It peaked at number two in Ireland and at number seven in Australia.

Critical reception

Rhythm of Love was met with generally positive reviews from music critics, being complimented as her best work with SAW. Chris True of AllMusic considered it to be a more accomplished album than either of Minogue's previous two releases, benefitting from the songwriting, production, and her confident vocals. Writing for Digital Spy, Nick Levine labeled the album as Minogue's best work despite its unevenness towards the end. Mark was impressed by the album's catchy and memorable material, praising "Step Back in Time" and "Better the Devil You Know" as two of the singer's finest singles.

Sweeney said the album is superior than Minogue's first releases by letting her charisma and vocal shine. He commended the producers for "[taking] a big step in the right direction". By contrast, Harrison criticized her collaborations with other producers as useless but noted there were steps to "reposition [Minogue] in the teen pop queen market". It was one of three of Minogue's studio albums to receive a four-star rating from British writer Colin Larkin in the Encyclopedia of Popular Music (2011) beside Light Years (2000) and Fever (2001), with him classifying it as "high standard".

In retrospect, Rhythm of Love is considered to be a turning point in Minogue's career. Ian Wade and Oliver Hurley from Classic Pop wrote the album flexes her compositional skills and hailed it "an underrated classic that richly deserves its due". In 2018, Sal Cinquemani of Slant Magazine selected the album as Minogue's strongest during the PWL era due to the choice of singles, and said the producers put Minogue "somewhere near, if not in, the same league as her female chart rivals for the first time". Ernest Macias from Entertainment Weekly said in 2018 that the album showcases Minogue, for the first time, as a "pop icon, propelled by her angelic vocals, sensual music videos, chic fashion, and distinct dance sound". Similarly, while reviewing the album on its 30th anniversary, Albumism's Quentin Harrison deemed it a "vibrant and colorful portrait of a young woman just starting to discover her creative voice", as well as a major advancement for her sound and look.

Commercial performance
Rhythm of Love was not as commercially successful as Minogue's previous albums. It debuted and peaked at number nine on the UK Albums Chart, becoming her third consecutive top 10 entry on the chart and her first studio album that did not reach number one. The album fell to number 16 the following week, and stayed in the top 20 for five weeks. In June 1991, Rhythm of Love re-entered the chart at number 62 and stayed on the chart for three more weeks. The album was certified gold by the British Phonographic Industry (BPI) on 6 December 1990 for selling 100,000 copies in the UK. Rhythm of Love has sold over 300,000 copies in the UK by March 1991; Tiller Rutherfold, general manager of PWL, said that the number "did not come up to expectations" from her previous releases. In 2015, the reissue of Rhythm of Love peaked at number 86 on the UK Albums Chart on 15 February. In Ireland, it peaked at number two on the album chart on the Irish Albums chart for 28 October 1990, according to Music & Media.

In Australia, Rhythm of Love debuted at number 17 on the ARIA Albums chart, and reached number 13 the following week but later fell down the chart. When Minogue was promoting the album with her Rhythm of Love Tour, it peaked at number 10 on the ARIA Albums chart in the week of 10 March 1991, becoming her third top 10 studio album four months after being released. Later that year, Rhythm of Love was certified platinum by the Australian Recording Industry Association (ARIA) for selling 70,000 copies in Australia. In New Zealand, the album spent one week on the NZ Top 40 Albums chart at number 36. It performed similarly in Sweden, peaking at number 44 on Sverigetopplistan's album chart. In Spain, Rhythm of Love reached number 26 and stayed on Promusicae's album chart for 10 weeks, and was later certified gold by the Productores de Música de España for selling 50,000 copies in Spain. In France, it peaked at number 25 and later became the 79th best-selling album of 1991. In Japan, the album peaked at number 32 on the Oricon Albums Chart and had sold 67,000 copies by 2006.

Track listing
All songs written, produced and arranged by Mike Stock, Matt Aitken and Pete Waterman, except where noted.

Notes
 "Step Back in Time" contains uncredited samples of "Hot Pants – I'm Coming, Coming, I'm Coming", written by James Brown, performed by Bobby Byrd; and "Give Up the Funk (Let's Dance)", written by B. T. Express and Carlos Ward, performed by B. T. Express.
 "Always Find the Time" contains a sample of "Candy Man", written and composed by Rick James, performed by the Mary Jane Girls.
 "One Boy Girl" includes guest vocals by American female rapper The Poetess, but is uncredited.

Personnel
Credits adapted from the album's liner notes.

 Kylie Minogue – lead vocals, backing vocals
 Matt Aitken – guitar, keyboards, arranger
 John DeFaria – guitar
 Stephen Bray – keyboards, producer
 Claude Gaudette – keyboards, arranger
 Mike Stock – keyboards, arranger
 Jim Oppenheim – saxophone
 Michael Jay – drum programming, arranger, producer
 Mark Leggett – drum programming
 Maxi Anderson – backing vocals
 Peggie Blu – backing vocals
 Joey Diggs – backing vocals
 Alice Echols – backing vocals

 Mae McKenna – backing vocals
 Miriam Stockley – backing vocals
 Linda Taylor – backing vocals
 Keith "KC" Cohen – producer, mixing, engineer
 Pete Waterman – arranger
 Peter Day – engineer
 Karen Hewitt – engineer
 John Chamberlin – assistant engineer
 Mauricio Guerrero – assistant engineer
 Kimm James – assistant engineer, assistant producer
 Sylvia Massy – assistant engineer, mixing assistant
 Mitch Zelezny – assistant engineer
 Nick Egan – art direction, design

Charts

Weekly charts

Year-end charts

Certifications and sales

Release history

See also
 List of UK top-ten albums in 1990

References

Citations

Websites

 
 
 
 
 
 
 
 
 
 
 
 
 
 
  The High Point number in the NAT column displays the release's peak on the national chart.
 
 
 
 
  Select Kylie MINOGUE from the drop-down menu and click OK.

Media notes

Print sources

 
 
 
 
 
 
 

 
 
 
 
 
 
 
 
 
 
 
 
 
  Original magazine article – via Google Books

External links
 
 Rhythm of Love at Kylie.com (archived from 2008)

1990 albums
Kylie Minogue albums
Albums produced by Stock Aitken Waterman
Albums produced by Stephen Bray
Mushroom Records albums